The V-League is a South Korean club volleyball competition. It was founded in 2005 and currently has seven men's clubs and seven women's clubs.

Teams

Men's clubs

Women's clubs

Champions

Men's champions

Titles by season

Titles by club

Women's Champions

Titles by season

Titles by club

Postseason results
Legend
 – Champions
 – Runners–up
 – Playoff loser
 – Semi–playoff loser
 – Did not qualify
 – Did not participate

Men

Women

MVP by edition

Regular round

Men
2005 – 
2005–06 – 
2006–07 – 
2007–08 – 
2008–09 – 
2009–10 – 
2010–11 – 
2011–12 – 
2012–13 – 
2013–14 – 
2014–15 – 
2015–16 – 
2016–17 – 
2017–18 – 
2018–19 – 
2019–20 – 
2020–21 – 

Women
2005 – 
2005–06 – 
2006–07 – 
2007–08 – 
2008–09 – 
2009–10 – 
2010–11 – 
2011–12 – 
2012–13 – 
2013–14 – 
2014–15 – , 
2015–16 – 
2016–17 – 
2017–18 – 
2018–19 – 
2019–20 – 
2020–21 –

Final

Men
2005 – 
2005–06 – 
2006–07 – 
2007–08 – 
2008–09 – 
2009–10 – 
2010–11 – 
2011–12 – 
2012–13 – 
2013–14 – 
2014–15 – 
2015–16 – 
2016–17 – 
2017–18 – 
2018–19 – 
2019–20 – 
2020–21 – 

Women
2005 – 
2005–06 – 
2006–07 – 
2007–08 – 
2008–09 – 
2009–10 – 
2010–11 – 
2011–12 – 
2012–13 – 
2013–14 – 
2014–15 – 
2015–16 – 
2016–17 – 
2017–18 – 
2018–19 – 
2019–20 – 
2020–21 – ,

Kovo Cup

Title sponsors

External links
Korea Volleyball Federation
  Korean V-League. women.volleybox.net 

 
Women's volleyball in South Korea
South Korea
Sports leagues in South Korea
Professional sports leagues in South Korea
Sports leagues established in 2005